Roberto Scarone Rivera (16 July 1917 – 25 April 1994) was a Uruguayan football player and manager. He is mainly known for his successful managing spell at the helm of the Uruguayan powerhouse Peñarol in the early 1960s.

Career
Scarone started playing professionally at his hometown club Peñarol in the 1930s. In 1939, at the age of 22, he moved to Gimnasia La Plata in Argentina where he spent four seasons. Between 1943 and 1947 he had spells with Mexican sides América and Atlante before coming back to Gimnasia in 1948. That same year he retired from active football and immediately took over as the club's coach.

His then spent the following three decades coaching a number of South American clubs in Argentina, Colombia, Chile, Peru, and Mexico. His greatest successes came in the early 1960s with Peñarol with whom he won three consecutive Uruguayan championships in 1959, 1960 and 1961, two Copa Libertadores titles (in 1960 and 1961) and the 1961 Intercontinental Cup. On account of his success with Peñarol he was made a member of the Uruguay national football team coaching staff in the 1962 FIFA World Cup, along with Juan Carlos Corazzo, Juan López Fontana and Hugo Bagnulo.

He also had considerable success coaching in Peru, winning four Peruvian championships with Centro Iqueño and Universitario de Deportes, and even took Universitario to the finals of the 1972 Copa Libertadores. In addition, he won the 1965–66 Mexican championship with Club América. He also had a brief stint managing Peru national football team in the 1974 FIFA World Cup qualifying campaign.

Scarone retired from coaching in 1982. After suffering from Alzheimer's disease in his later years, Scarone died on 25 April 1994 in his hometown of Montevideo.

Honours
National
 4 × Peruvian League: 1957 (with Centro Iqueño) and 1969, 1971 and 1982 (with Universitario)
 4 × Uruguayan League: 1959, 1960, 1961 (with Peñarol) and 1966 (with Nacional)
 1 × Mexican League: 1965–66 (with América)

International
 2 × Copa Libertadores: 1960, 1961 (with Peñarol)
 1 × Intercontinental Cup: 1961 (with Peñarol)

References

1917 births
1994 deaths
Uruguayan footballers
Uruguayan football managers
Peñarol players
Club de Gimnasia y Esgrima La Plata footballers
Club América footballers
Atlante F.C. footballers
Liga MX players
Uruguayan expatriate footballers
Expatriate footballers in Mexico
Expatriate footballers in Argentina
Club de Gimnasia y Esgrima La Plata managers
Deportivo Cali managers
Centro Iqueño managers
Audax Italiano managers
Club Alianza Lima managers
Ñublense managers
Peñarol managers
Uruguay national football team managers
C.F. Monterrey managers
Club América managers
Club Nacional de Football managers
Club Universitario de Deportes managers
Peru national football team managers
San Lorenzo de Almagro managers
Footballers from Montevideo
Deaths from dementia in Uruguay
Deaths from Alzheimer's disease
Expatriate football managers in Argentina
Expatriate football managers in Chile
Expatriate football managers in Colombia
Expatriate football managers in Peru
Expatriate football managers in Mexico
Association football fullbacks
Danubio F.C. managers